Have Fun, Vasya! is a 2017 Russian comedy film directed by Roman Karimov.
The main roles were performed by Efim Petrunin as Mitya and Lyubov Aksyonova as Vasya.

Plot
Mitya (Efim Petrunin) accidentally proposes to Alisa (Svetlana Stepankovskaya), and the girl's father immediately sets the date for their wedding. The situation is complicated by the fact that Mitya still has not divorced from his ex – Vasya (Lyubov Aksyonova), and naturally he does not want to tell his bride and her father about this. Vasya is ready to agree to a divorce only after her still lawful husband fulfills a number of conditions; one of them is that he must present her to his bride.

Mitya finds a girl, Nastya (Sofya Rayzman), who agrees to appear before Vasya as the bride. Nastya's boyfriend Maks (Roman Kurtsyn), after learning about this gets furious at first, but then agrees to also take part in this affair in return for a considerable fee from Mitya. Then the events unfold in such a way that Mitya and Nastya fall in love with each other.

Cast
 Efim Petrunin as Dmitriy 'Mitya'
 Lyubov Aksyonova as Vasilisa 'Vasya', Mitya's wife, from whom he demands a divorce 
 Boris Dergachev as Pasha, Mitya's friend 
 Sofya Rayzman as Nastya, a waitress
 Roman Kurtsyn as Maks, Nastya's husband, former boxer
 Svetlana Stepankovskaya as Alisa, the girl to whom Mitya has proposed
 Sergey Abroskin as Garik, Mitya's friend
  as Kira, Pasha's wife 
 Anna Tsukanova-Kott as Nonna, Kira's friend
Stanislav Tlyashev as Renat, taxi driver
Olga Lebedeva as Alisa's mom
Mikhail Khmurov as Alisa's dad
Sofia Lebedeva as actress of the avant-garde theater
Alexander Golubkov as Smirnov, paratrooper
Maxim Derichev as Vladislav, security guard of the club
Ekaterina Kabak as Helen, the girl in the club
Nikita Savinkin as Vanya

Reception 
The film received generally positive response from critics. In 2021, a sequel titled Have Fun, Vasya! Date in Bali (ru) was released.

Release 
The film premiered on February 14, 2017 in theaters. The television premiere of the comedy is on August 29, 2017 on the STS (TV channel).

References

External links 

2017 comedy films
Russian comedy films
Films directed by Roman Karimov